Cryptomitrium is a genus of complex thalloid liverworts in the family Aytoniaceae. The genus name means “hidden turban” in reference to the inconspicuous sheath around the immature sporangium.

Description 
Sporophyte bearing receptacles are unlobed on  elongate, somewhat grooved stalks, which appear pale throughout or brownish purple near the base. The receptacle is a convex-expanded disc, thinning towards the margins.

Mature sporangia are brown, nearly spherical with very short seta, three to seven per receptacle, each opening by a lid-like operculum. The sporangia mature in early spring.

Species 
Cryptomitrium himalayense Kashyap
Cryptomitrium oreades PeroldCryptomitrium tenerum'' (Hook.) Austin ex Underw.

References 

Aytoniaceae
Marchantiales genera